Ramrod is an EP by Scraping Foetus Off the Wheel released by Self Immolation/Some Bizzare in 1987.

Track listing

Personnel 
Charles Gray – production, engineering
Warne Livesy – production, engineering
J. G. Thirlwell (as Clint Ruin) – instruments, production, mixing, illustrations

Charts

References

External links 
 
 Ramrod at foetus.org

1987 EPs
Foetus (band) albums
Albums produced by JG Thirlwell
Some Bizzare Records EPs